Funiculaire Sierre–Montana–Crans (abbreviated SMC) is a funicular railway in Valais, Switzerland. The line leads from Sierre at 540 m to Crans-Montana at 1471 m. The funicular has a single section of about 4300 m since 1997 making it the longest. Earlier, it had two sections with the break at St-Maurice-de-Laques. The funicular with two cars has a single track with a passing loop. The funicular was closed from March to December 2022 for new tracks and cars, fewer intermediate stations to allow 20-minute intervals and a journey time of 14 minutes.

The lower station is located near the Sierre/Siders railway station on the Simplon line. Intermediate stations are at Venthône and Bluche-Randogne.

The funicular was opened in 1911. The line is operated by "Compagnie de Chemin de Fer et d’Autobus Sierre-Montana-Crans (SMC) SA".

Further reading

References 

Sierre-Montana-Crans
Transport in Valais
1200 mm gauge railways in Switzerland
Railway lines opened in 1994